The 1880 United States presidential election in Pennsylvania took place on November 2, 1880, as part of the 1880 United States presidential election. Voters chose 29 representatives, or electors to the Electoral College, who voted for president and vice president.

Pennsylvania voted for the Republican nominee, James A. Garfield, over the Democratic nominee, Winfield Scott Hancock. Garfield won Pennsylvania by a margin of 4.27%. Had Hancock won the state, the election would have been decided by one electoral vote, like the 1876 election.

Results

Results by county

See also
 List of United States presidential elections in Pennsylvania

References

Pennsylvania
1880
1880 Pennsylvania elections